Alfred Harding (August 15, 1852 – May 2, 1923) was the second Episcopal Bishop of Washington. He was elected in 1909 to succeed the Henry Yates Satterlee, the founding bishop of the Diocese of Washington (1896–1908). Harding was de facto dean of the Cathedral from 1909 until 1916.

Biography
Harding was born on August 15, 1852, in Ireland, the son of Richard Harding. He emigrated in 1867 to the United States, settling in Brooklyn, Kings County, New York.  He became a naturalized citizen in 1870 and spent several years as a businessman.

Education
Harding graduated from Trinity College, Hartford, Connecticut, in 1879. He completed his studies at the Berkeley Divinity School, graduating in 1882.

Marriage
Harding married in 1887 Justine Prindle Douglas, who was born on June 16, 1853 in New York City and died on February 6, 1909 in Washington, D.C. She was the daughter of Dr. John Hancock Douglas, an 1843 graduate of Williams College, and the University of Pennsylvania School of Medicine in 1847. He was the personal physician for President Ulysses S. Grant, attending him from 22 October 1884, till the death of the latter, 23 July 1885.  Alfred and Justine were the parents of four children, three of whom survived to adulthood: Alfred J., Charlotte G. and Paul Curtis. A son, Douglas died in 1891 at the age of 3.

Ordination
In 1882, Harding was ordained a deacon by Abram N. Littlejohn, the first Episcopal Bishop of Long Island and in 1883 he was ordained a priest again by Littlejohn.  The year of his deaconate was spent as an assistant to Henry M. Nelson Jr., rector of Trinity Church, Geneva, New York. From 1883 to 1887, he was the assistant rector of Old St. Paul's Parish in Baltimore, Maryland. He was third rector of St. Paul's, K Street, Washington, D.C., serving from 1887 until 1909 when he became the Bishop of Washington, D.C. In 1889 he was invited to Christ Church Cathedral, St. Louis, Missouri, but declined.

Consecration
On January 25, 1909, Harding was consecrated the second Episcopal Bishop of Washington at Trinity Episcopal Church in Washington, D.C. The consecrator was Charles E. Woodcock, the third Episcopal Bishop of Kentucky. Harding was the 240th bishop consecrated in the Episcopal Church.

When the Harriet Lane Johnston choir school (St. Albans) opened, nine years after the National Cathedral School for Girls, Harding made Edgar Priest supervisor of music at these schools in August 1909. His formal appointment as the cathedral's first organist and choirmaster came in 1911 in anticipation of the opening of Bethlehem Chapel for services the following May.

Death
Harding died on May 2, 1923, in Washington, D.C. Both he and his wife are buried in the Resurrection Chapel of Washington National Cathedral.

References

External links

 Episcopal Diocese of Washington
 Washington National Cathedral
Church Website
, including photo from 1985, at Maryland Historical Trust
Old St. Paul's Episcopal Church website

1852 births
1923 deaths
Anglo-Catholic bishops
Episcopal bishops of Washington
People from Brooklyn
American Episcopal priests
19th-century American Episcopalians
Trinity College (Connecticut) alumni
Berkeley Divinity School alumni
Burials at Washington National Cathedral
Irish emigrants to the United States (before 1923)
20th-century American Episcopalians
American Anglo-Catholics
Irish Anglo-Catholics